The  is the main transport provider in Matsuyama, Ehime, Shikoku, Japan. The company operates railway, tram, and bus lines, and also has many subsidiaries, which include a bank, department stores, travel agencies, and various other businesses.

History
The company was founded on September 14, 1887, and its Takahama railway line, the first in Shikoku, was opened on October 28, 1888. In addition to being the first railway in Shikoku, it was also the third private railway in Japan. It is named for the former Iyo Province. The first tramway was electrified in 1911, whilst the entire tram network was changed from  gauge to  gauge in 1923.

Services

Railway

Iyotetsu operates the following railway lines.

Takahama Line
This line is still electrified at 600 V DC, not increased to 750 V DC as Yokogawara or Gunchū Lines. The Takahama Line and the Ōtemachi Tramline have one of the few remaining rail/tram level crossings in Japan.

Yokogawara Line
Steam locomotives were replaced by diesel traction in 1954, and the line was electrified at 750 V DC in 1967. Through services to and from  the Takahama line commenced in 1981.

Gunchū Line
The initial 10.7 km line was opened as a  gauge line in 1896 by the South Iyo Railway. Iyotetsu acquired it through merger in 1900. In 1939, a 600 m extension opened to Gunchuko, enabling a transfer to JR Iyo station (today  on the Yosan Line. The line was electrified in 1950 at 600 V DC, increased to 750 V DC in 1976.

CTC signalling was introduced on the rail system in 1993.

Former connecting lines
A 4.4 km 762 mm gauge line opened from Iyo Tachibana (on the Takahama line) to Morimatsu in 1896, the line being regauged to 1,067 mm in 1931. The line closed in 1965.

Tram

Lines
There are officially five lines, as follows.
 Jōhoku Line: Komachi — Heiwadōri 1
 Jōnan Line:  Dōgo Onsen — Nishi-Horibata, Kamiichiman — Heiwadōri 1
 Honmachi Line: Nishi-Horibata — Hommachi 6
 Ōtemachi Line: Nishi-Horibata — JR Matsuyama Station — Komachi
 Hanazono Line: Matsuyama City Station — Minami-Horibata

Routes
There are five routes regularly in service by using one or more lines above.

Bus

The company operates highway buses linking Matsuyama and the major cities of Japan, including Tokyo, Ōsaka, Fukuyama, Takamatsu, Tokushima, and Kōchi. It also operates a local network in and around the city.

Rolling stock

Heavy rail
 Iyotetsu 700 series two/three-car EMU sets (since 1987, converted from former Keio 5000 series trains)
 Iyotetsu 610 series two-car EMU sets (since 1995)
 Iyotetsu 3000 series three-car EMU sets (since 2009, converted from former Keio 3000 series trains)

Trams
 MoHa 50 series (since 1951)
 MoHa 2000 series (since 1964)
 MoHa 2100 series (since 2002)
 MoHa 5000 series (from September 2017)

Two 5000 series low-floor tramcars (numbers 5001 and 5002) were delivered in September 2017, scheduled to enter revenue service on 21 September 2017.

Former rolling stock
 Iyotetsu 100 series
 Iyotetsu 300 series (until 2008)
 Iyotetsu 600 series (until 2008)
 Iyotetsu 800 series (until 2010, converted from former Keio 2010 series trains)

Botchan Ressha

Iyo Railway also operates the Botchan Ressha, diesel-powered replicas of the original Iyotetsu locomotives, well-known from Natsume Sōseki's famous 1906 novel, Botchan. The current Botchan Ressha, operating on two of the city lines since 2001, reproduces the atmosphere of early train travel in Matsuyama.

See also 
 List of railway companies in Japan
 List of light-rail transit systems
 Track gauge conversion
 List of gauge conversions

References
This article incorporates material from the corresponding article in the Japanese Wikipedia.

External links

  

 
Railway companies of Japan
Bus companies of Japan
Tram transport in Japan
Japanese companies established in 1887
Railway companies established in 1887
600 V DC railway electrification
750 V DC railway electrification